Qeytur (also Romanized as Qeyţūr; also known as Goytor, Koytur, Qaitur, and Qoyţūr) is a village in Zanjanrud-e Pain Rural District, Zanjanrud District, Zanjan County, Zanjan Province, Iran. At the 2006 census, its population was 151, in 29 families.

References 

Populated places in Zanjan County